William Verna Brown (July 8, 1893 – May 13, 1965), nicknamed "Verno", was a Major League Baseball left fielder who played with the St. Louis Browns in .

External links

1893 births
1965 deaths
Major League Baseball left fielders
Baseball players from Texas
St. Louis Browns players
Wichita Falls Drillers players
Hugo Hugoites players
Hugo Scouts players
Fort Worth Panthers players
Toronto Maple Leafs (International League) players
Portland Duffs players
Temple Surgeons players
People from Coleman, Texas